The Council for Interior Design Qualification (CIDQ) is independent of state and provincial credentialing bodies and provides the North American public with means to identify interior designers who have demonstrated the minimum level of competence needed to practice interior design. In fulfillment of this purpose, CIDQ provides a professional examination in interior design. The majority of the examination covers those aspects of the practice of interior design that affect the public's health, life style and welfare.

About CIDQ
CIDQ is an organization of regulatory boards and provincial associations in the United States and Canada whose core purpose is to protect the health, life safety and welfare of the public by establishing standards of competence in the practice of interior design. CIDQ serves to identify to the public those interior designers who have met the minimum standards for professional practice by passing the NCIDQ Examination. Completion of the NCIDQ Examination recognizes that an individual has met minimum competency standards for the practice of interior design. 

Passage of the exam is a requirement for licensure in all CIDQ member jurisdictions. The exam also serves as a qualifier for professional membership within interior design organizations and, for non-affiliates, represents a voluntary individual accomplishment.

Certificate holders
While CIDQ does not offer membership to individuals, professional interior designers can become Certificate holders by completing the examination process. Individuals who meet CIDQ's eligibility requirements and pass all required sections of the NCIDQ Examination are each assigned a unique NCIDQ Certificate number. Certificate holders who pay an annual Certificate Renewal fee receive exclusive Active Certificate holder benefits and discounts.

Acceptance
Successful completion of the NCIDQ Examination is a prerequisite for professional registration in those American states and Canadian provinces that have enacted licensing or certification statutes to protect the health, safety and welfare of the public. The NCIDQ Examination must also be passed by every interior designer applying for professional membership with the American Society of Interior Designers (ASID).

Administration
Representatives from state/provincial regulatory agencies are appointed to serve as delegates on the CIDQ Council of Delegates for two-year terms. 

Beyond the Council's responsibilities for conducting and jurying the examination in locations throughout North America, it is charged with defining, researching and updating bodies of knowledge, conducting field surveys, analyzing candidate performance, evaluating subject areas and item validity, developing and pretesting questions and problems, improving scoring, implementing grading and jurying procedures, reviewing education and practice requirements, and identifying public health, safety and welfare issues.

History
Conceived in the late 1960s to serve as a basis for issuing credentials to today's professional interior design practitioner, the Council has been in effect since 1972. It was formalized as a not-for-profit organization when it was incorporated in 1974. CIDQ's founders were the American Institute of Interior Designers (AID) and the National Society of Interior Designers (NSID), two national organizations that were then preparing to merge into what became the American Society of Interior Designers (ASID). All national design organizations, whose membership was made up in total or in part of interior designers, were asked to join. Now a fully independent organization, CIDQ develops and delivers the NCIDQ Examination, twice each year to help ensure the health, safety and welfare of the public are protected in the practice of interior design.

The parent organizations decided that a separate council was needed to develop, administer and certify, through a qualifying examination, the interior design practitioner competent to practice; and also to study and present plans, programs and guidelines for the statutory licensing of interior design practitioners.

Criticism
Exam fees require a minimum of $1310 to become NCIDQ certified (not including any classes, materials, books, or late fees/ cancellation fees that may occur due to their unclear deadline schedule) and also $75/ year to remain active status and to use the "NCIDQ" letters behind your name per their appellation agreement. Certainly, this is very constraining for entry level interior designers and especially concerning for a nonprofit agency. 
http://www.cidq.org/fees

References

External links
 Official website

Interior design